Tai Wan Village is a village located in the area of Yung Shue Wan on the North side of Lamma Island, the third largest island in the territory of Hong Kong. It comprises the two settlements Tai Wan Kau Tsuen and Tai Wan San Tsuen.

Administration
Tai Wan Kau Tsuen and Tai Wan San Tsuen are recognized village under the New Territories Small House Policy.

History
At the time of the 1911 census, the population of Tai Wan was 113. The number of males was 52.

References

External links

 Delineation of area of existing village Tai Wan Kau Tsuen (Lamma North) for election of resident representative (2019 to 2022)
 Delineation of area of existing village Tai Wan San Tsuen (Lamma North) for election of resident representative (2019 to 2022)
 Antiquities Advisory Board. Historic Building Appraisal. Chan Study Hall, Tai Wan San Tsuen, Yung Shue Wan Pictures

Villages in Islands District, Hong Kong
Lamma Island